Grebbestad is a locality situated in Tanum Municipality, Västra Götaland County, Sweden. As of 2010, there were 1,401 inhabitants, though this number can increase by as much as ten-fold during the summer. The town is also the harbour where the majority of Norway lobster (in Swedish havskräfta) are landed, as well as oysters.

Sports
The following sports clubs are located in Grebbestad:
 Grebbestads IF

See also
Greby

References

External links
  Tourist map of Grebbestad
  Tanum Municipality: Grebbestad
  Grebbestad official website

Populated places in Västra Götaland County
Populated places in Tanum Municipality